Donjek may refer to:

 Donjek Glacier, a glacier in Kluane National Park, Yukon, Canada
 Donjek River, a river in Yukon, Canada, see Yukon River